The Ahoko is a traditional percussion instrument originating from the central part of Ivory Coast (Côte d'Ivoire) in West Africa.

The ahoko is a wooden rod with nutshells, each containing loose seeds, tied to strings which are then tightly wound around the end of the rod. The percussive sound can range from quiet to very loud.

In the Hornbostel–Sachs system it is categorised as 112.13 as a vessel rattle, a type of indirectly struck idiophone.

Notable performers 

 Antoinette Konan

See also
 Music of Africa

References

External links
 List of musical instruments: Encyclopedia II - List of musical instruments - Percussion instruments lists the ahoko as an other percussion instrument, i.e. not a drum.
 Juju Seed Rattle from African Treasures. Service Provider of Percussion Instruments from usa Juju Seed Rattle. Description: Also called Ahoko. Nutshells are attached at the end of a wooden handle to make a full resonant rattle sound. Effects range from a very loud tone when shaken strongly, to a quiet rattle when the handle is barely turned.

Struck idiophones
Ivorian musical instruments
Hand percussion
African percussion instruments
Unpitched percussion instruments